Finn Edward Ecrepont (born 30 July 2002) is a Scottish professional footballer who plays for Stranraer, on loan from Ayr United. He has also played for Albion Rovers.

Early life
Ecrepont was born in Scotland in 2002. He attended Alloway Primary School and had plans to play as a left back.

Club career

Ayr United
Ecrepont joined Ayr United at the age of 9, swiftly moving through the under-17, under-20 and under-21 teams. On 1 July 2018, he signed a senior three-year contract. As well as playing for Ayr's youth teams he said that he often does a few shifts at Cafe Ginger which his dad Eddy runs. At first, Ecrepont struggled to find a school that would accept him because of his footballing duties as he was training four mornings a week after signing a new contract but Ayr Academy let him in.

Ecrepont made his debut, coming off the bench against Dundee Utd in the Scottish Championship on 30 November 2018.

On 26 January 2023, Ecrepont joined Scottish League Two club Stranraer on loan until the end of the season.

International career
On 25 July 2017 aged just 14, Ecrepont made his Scotland under-16 debut in a 7–0 thrashing of Qatar. He went on to gain 9 caps and score 1 goal at that level.

On 19 August 2018 August, Ecrepont made his debut for the under-17s in a 1–0 win over Russia.

Career statistics

References

2002 births
Association football defenders
Ayr United F.C. players
Albion Rovers F.C. players
Stranraer F.C. players
Living people
Scottish footballers
Scottish Professional Football League players
Scotland youth international footballers